Bhoda Hoshnak is a village in Fatehabad district of Haryana, India. It is 187 km west of Delhi on National Highway 9 (old NH10).

References 

Villages in Fatehabad district